Marta Bobo Arce (born 18 March 1966 in Orense) is a retired Spanish rhythmic gymnast.

She competed for Spain in the rhythmic gymnastics all-around competition at the 1984 Summer Olympics in Los Angeles. She was eighth in the qualification and advanced to the final, placing ninth overall.

References

External links 
 
 «No gané una medalla olímpica por el aire acondicionado» — La Voz de Galicia
 Marta Bobo: "No cambiaría la vida que tengo por haber tenido medalla en los Juegos Olímpicos" — La Opinión a Coruña

1966 births
Living people
Spanish rhythmic gymnasts
Gymnasts at the 1984 Summer Olympics
Olympic gymnasts of Spain
Sportspeople from Ourense